The Centre for Artificial Intelligence and Robotics (CAIR) is a laboratory of the Defence Research & Development Organization (DRDO). Located in Bangalore, Karnataka, involved in the Research & Development of high quality Secure Communication, Command and Control, and Intelligent Systems. CAIR was founded by Arogyaswami Paulraj. CAIR is the primary laboratory for R&D in different areas of Defence Information and Communication Technology (ICT).

History 

CAIR was established in October 1986. Its research focus was initially in the areas of Artificial Intelligence (AI), Robotics, and Control systems. In November 2000, R&D groups working in the areas of Command, Control, Communications & Intelligence (C3I) systems, Communication and Networking, and communication secrecy in Electronics and Radar Development Establishment (LRDE) were merged with CAIR.

CAIR, which was operating from different campuses across Bangalore has now moved .

Projects
 DRDO NETRA, software to intercept online communications.
 SecOS, Secure Operating System
 Muntra - unmanned ground vehicle manufactured at the Ordnance Factory Medak.

External links 
 CAIR Home Page
 Robot soldiers!

Defence Research and Development Organisation laboratories
Artificial intelligence laboratories
Research institutes in Bangalore
Laboratories in India
1986 establishments in Karnataka
Research institutes established in 1986
Robotics in India